Suruceni is a village in Ialoveni District, Moldova, 22 km from Chișinău.

It has been the site, since 1785, of Suruceni Monastery of St George, a community of Orthodox nuns. The sisters farm land on the edge of the village, and maintain two monastic churches which are open to the public at certain times.

Sport
FC Sfântul Gheorghe Suruceni is based in the village.

Notable people
 Ion Suruceanu
 Nicolae Suruceanu
 Vasile Ciorăscu

References

Villages of Ialoveni District